Melaleuca urceolaris is a low, spreading shrub in the myrtle family Myrtaceae and is endemic to the south-west of Western Australia. Although it is rare in cultivation, it is an attractive garden plant due to its soft foliage and white flowers which fade to pink or red. It is similar to Melaleuca scabra with which it has often been confused.

Description

The flowers appear from August and November and are initially white to cream or lemon-yellow but age to  pinkish or red. The stamens are arranged in bundles of five around the flower, with 9 to 15 stamens in each bundle.

Taxonomy and naming
Melaleuca urceolaris was first formally described in 1867 by George Bentham in Flora Australiensis. The specific epithet (urceolaris) is derived from the Latin urceus meaning "urn" or "pitcher" referring to the shape of the fruit.

Distribution and habitat
Melaleuca urceolaris occurs in the Arrino-Jurien Bay-Gingin districts in the Avon Wheatbelt, Geraldton Sandplains, Jarrah Forest, Mallee and Swan Coastal Plain biogeographic regions. It grows in dense heath, low shrubland and woodland on sand, sand over laterite, sandy clay, and gravel.

Conservation
Calothamnus urceolaris is classified as "not threatened" by the Government of Western Australia Department of Parks and Wildlife.

Uses

Horticulture
This species is described as "a handsome foliage shrub, spectacular in flower in good forms" growing well in poor sandy soil in winter-rainfall, temperate to semi-dry areas.

Essential oils
This leaf oil of this species is mostly monoterpenoid yielding about 0.6% (weight/weight) from fresh leaves.

References

urceolaris
Myrtales of Australia
Plants described in 1867
Endemic flora of Western Australia
Taxa named by Ferdinand von Mueller
Taxa named by George Bentham